The Syracuse Air Defense Sector (SADS) is an inactive United States Air Force organization. Its last assignment was with the Air Defense Command (ADC) 26th Air Division at Hancock Field, New York.

SADS was  established in October 1956 as the 4624th Air Defense Wing, SAGE at Syracuse Air Force Station (AFS), New York, assuming control of former ADC Eastern Air Defense Force units primarily in western New York, most of Pennsylvania and a small portion of western Maryland and eastern West Virginia. It controlled several aircraft and radar squadrons.

On 15 August 1958 the new Semi Automatic Ground Environment (SAGE) Direction Center (DC-03)  and Combat Center (CC-01) became operational.    DC-03  was equipped with dual AN/FSQ-7 Computers.   The day-to-day operations of the command were to train and maintain tactical units flying jet interceptor aircraft (F-89 Scorpion, F-101 Voodoo, F-102 Delta Dagger) and operating radars and interceptor missiles (CIM-10 Bomarc)in a state of readiness with training missions and a series of exercises with Strategic Air Command and other units simulating interceptions of incoming enemy aircraft.  In early 1958, Syracuse AFS was renamed Hancock Field.

The Sector was inactivated on 4 September 1963 when the 26th Air Division headquarters moved to Hancock Field and the Syracuse Sector, in a realignment of sector boundaries, merged with the Boston Air Defense Sector.

Lineage 
 Designated as 4624th Air Defense Wing, SAGE and organized on 1 October 1956
 Redesignated Syracuse Air Defense Sector on 8 January 1957
 Inactivated on 4 September 1963

Assignments 
 32nd Air Division, 1 October 1956
 26th Air Division, 15 August 1958 – 4 September 1963

Stations 
 Syracuse AFS, (later Hancock Field) New York, 1 October 1956 – 4 September 1963

Components 
 15th Fighter Group (Air Defense)
 Niagara Falls Municipal Airport, New York, 1 September 1958 - 1 July 1960
 49th Fighter-Interceptor Squadron 
 Griffiss AFB, New York, 1 August 1959 - 4 September 1963
 35th Air Defense Missile Squadron (BOMARC)
 Niagara Falls Air Force Missile Site, New York, 1 June 1960 - 4 September 1963

Radar Squadrons 

 648th Aircraft Control & Warning Squadron (later 648th Radar Squadron (SAGE))
 Benton AFS, Pennsylvania, 15 August 1958 - 4 September 1963
 655th Aircraft Control & Warning Squadron (later 655th Radar Squadron (SAGE))
 Watertown AFS, New York, 1 September 1958 - 4 September 1963
 662nd Aircraft Control & Warning Squadron (later 662d Radar Squadron (SAGE))
 Brookfield AFS, Ohio (moved to Oakdale Army Installation), Pennsylvania in July 1960, 15 June 1960-4 September 1963

 763rd Aircraft Control & Warning Squadron (later 763d Radar Squadron (SAGE))
 Lockport AFS, New York, 1 September 1958 - 4 September 1963
 772nd Aircraft Control & Warning Squadron (later 772d Radar Squadron (SAGE))
 Claysburg AFS, Pennsylvania, 15 August 1958 - 1 May 1961

Weapons Systems 
 F-89J, 1959-1959
 F-101B, 1959-1963
 F-102A, 1958-1960
 IM-99 (later CIM-10), 1960-1963

See also
 List of USAF Aerospace Defense Command General Surveillance Radar Stations
 Aerospace Defense Command Fighter Squadrons
 List of United States Air Force aircraft control and warning squadrons

Notes

References

 
 
 * Radomes.org Syracuse Air Defense Sector

Syra
1956 establishments in New York (state)
1963 disestablishments in New York (state)
Military units and formations established in 1956
Military units and formations in New York (state)